This article is intended to give an overview of liberalism in Slovakia.

History
Liberalism has never influenced politics in Slovakia. The neoliberal Alliance of the New Citizen (Aliancia Nového Občana, observer LI, member ELDR) campaigns on a relatively liberal platform.

From Independent Hungarian Initiative to Hungarian Civic Party
1989: Hungarian liberals establish the Independent Hungarian Initiative (Független Magyar Kezdeményezés)
1992: The party is renamed the Hungarian Civic Party (Magyar Polgári Párt)
1998: The party merged into the Hungarian Coalition Party (Magyar Koalíció Pártja)

From Alliance of Democrats to Democratic Union of Slovakia
1944: The conservative Democratic Party (Demokratická strana) was founded
1948: DS was replaced by the por-communist Party of Slovak Revival (Strana slovenskej obrody)
1989: SSO renamed itself to Democratic Party (Demokratická strana)
1989: Public Against Violence (Verejnosť proti násiliu) was formed
1991: VPN was renamed to Civic Democratic Union (Občianska demokratická únia)
1993: Dissidents from the Movement for a Democratic Slovakia established the Alliance of Democrats of the Slovak Republic, led by Milan Kňažko
1994: The party merged with a second dissident group, the Alliance for Political Realism, into the Democratic Union of Slovakia (Demokratická Únia na Slovensku)
1994: ODÚ and Democrats 92 merged into DS
1995: The party merged with the National Democratic Party into the Democratic Union (Demokratická Únia)
2000: Liberal Democratic Union (Liberálnodemokratická únia) split from DÚ
2001: Civic Conservative Party split from DÚ
2002: DÚ and DS merged into the Slovak Democratic and Christian Union (Slovenská demokratická a kresťanská únia)
2004: Free Forum (Slobodné fórum) split from SDKÚ-DS
2002: LDÚ was renamed to Democratic Union of Slovakia (Demokratická Únia na Slovensku)
2006: Democratic Party of Slovakia (Demokratická strana Slovenska) was formed
2007: DSS renamed itself to Democratic Party (Demokratická strana)
2010: The party was renamed to Change from Bottom, Democratic Union of Slovakia (Zmena zdola, Demokratická únia Slovenska)
2016: SF dissolved
2018: Together – Civic Democracy (SPOLU – občianska demokracia) led by former SDKÚ-DS member Miroslav Beblavý split from #SIEŤ
2018: SDKÚ-DS dissolved
2019: Former SDKÚ-DS MP Ondrej Matej founds Transportation (DOPRAVA) later renamed to Voice of the Right (Hlas pravice)

Alliance of the New Citizen to Freedom and Solidarity
2001: Liberals around Pavol Rusko established the Alliance of the New Citizen (Aliancia Nového Občana)
2006: Hope (NÁDEJ) split from ANO
2007-2009: End of the activity of ANO
2008: Former Minister of Economy Robert Nemcsics (ANO) founds League, Civic-Liberal Party (LIGA, občiansko-liberálna strana)
2009, March: Liberals around the economist Richard Sulík established the Freedom and Solidarity (Sloboda a Solidarita), which is the ideological successor of the Alliance of the New Citizen
2009, August: NÁDEJ dissolves
2013: LIGA renames itself to DIRECT DEMOCRACY, becomes an eurosceptic and separates from their liberal roots

Other parties
2009: European Democratic Party (EURÓPSKA DEMOKRATICKÁ STRANA) was formed
2016–17: Liberals founded Progressive Slovakia (Progresívne Slovensko)

See also
 History of Slovakia
 Politics of Slovakia
 List of political parties in Slovakia

Slovakia
Political history of Slovakia